Tissue clearing refers to a group of chemical techniques used to turn tissues transparent. This allows deep insight into these tissues, while preserving spatial resolution. Many tissue clearing methods exist, each with different strengths and weaknesses. Some are generally applicable, while others are designed for specific applications. Tissue clearing is usually combined with one or more labeling techniques and subsequently imaged, most often by optical sectioning microscopy techniques. Tissue clearing has been applied to many areas in biological research.

History 
In the early 1900s, Werner Spalteholz developed a technique that allowed the clarification of large tissues, using Wintergrünöl (methyl salicylate) and benzyl benzoate. Over the next hundred years, various scientists introduced their own variations on Spalteholz's technique. Tuchin et al. introduced TOC in 1997, adding a new branch of tissue clearing that was hydrophilic instead of hydrophobic like Spalteholz's technique. In 2007, Dodt et al. developed a two step process, wherein tissues were first dehydrated with ethanol and hexane and subsequently made transparent by immersion in benzyl alcohol and benzyl benzoate (BABB), a technique they coupled with light sheet fluorescence microscopy. Hama et al. developed another hydrophilic approach, Scale, in 2011. The following year, Ertürk et al. developed a hydrophobic approach called 3DISCO, in which they pretreated tissue with tetrahydrofuran and dichloromethane before clearing it in dibenzyl ether. A year later, in 2013, Chung et al. developed CLARITY, the first approach to use hydrogel monomers to clear tissue.

Principles 
Tissue opacity is thought to the result of light scattering due to heterogeneous refractive indices. Tissue clearing methods chemically homogenize refractive indices, resulting in almost completely transparent tissue.

Classifications 
While multiple classification standards for tissue clearing exist, the most common classifications use the chemical principle and mechanism of clearing to group tissue clearing methods. These include hydrophobic clearing methods, which may also be known as organic, solvent-based, organic solvent-based, or dehydration clearing methods; hydrophilic clearing methods, which may also be known as aqueous-based or water-based methods, and may be further sub-categorized into simple immersion and hyperhydration (also called delipidation/hydation); and hydrogel-based clearing methods, which may also be known as detergent or hydrogel embedding methods. Tissue-expansion clearing methods use hydrogel, and may be included under hydrogel-based clearing or as their own category.

Methods 
Common methods include those of the DISCO family, including 3DISCO, and CLARITY and related protocols. Others include BABB, PEGASOS, SHANEL, SeeDB, CUBIC, ExM, and SHIELD.

Labeling 
Tissue clearing methods have varying compatibility with different methods of fluorescent labeling. Some are better suited to pre-clearing tagging approaches, such as genetic labeling. while others require post-clearing tagging, such as immunolabeling and chemical dye labeling.

Imaging 
After clearing and labeling, tissues are typically imaged using confocal microscopy, two-photon microscopy, or one of the many variants of light-sheet fluorescence microscopy. Other less commonly used methods include optical projection tomography and stimulated Raman scattering.

Data 
Imaging cleared tissues generates massive volumes of complex data, which requires powerful computational hardware and software to store, process, analyze, and visualize. A single mouse brain can generate terabytes of data. Both commercial and open-source software exists to address this need, some of it adapted from solutions for two-dimensional images and some of it designed specifically for the three-dimensional images produced by imaging of cleared tissues.

Applications 
Tissue clearing has been applied to the nervous system, bones (including teeth), skeletal muscles, hearts and vasculature, gastrointestinal organs, urogenital organs, skin, lymph nodes, mammary glands, lungs, eyes, tumors, and adipose tissues. Whole-body clearing is less common, but has been done in smaller animals, including rodents. Tissue clearing has also been applied to human cancer tissues

References 

Tissue engineering